32Red is a British online casino company licensed in Gibraltar.

Overview
Users of the website are able to play over 500 casino games including blackjack and roulette, along with sports betting and poker. The games at 32Red are provided by leading developers such as Microgaming, NetEnt, Big Time Gaming and Rabcat, and the site has also launched a bingo section where players can play 75-ball and 90-ball bingo variations. Players can play for pound sterling, euro, U.S. dollars, Canadian dollars, Australian dollars or Japanese yen.

Sponsorship
32Red advertises to the Premier League market by hosting numerous advertising boards at different grounds. They also kit sponsored Aston Villa between 2006 and 2008. 10 years later, the company sponsored Villa's kit again. On 25 June 2009, 32Red were announced official main sponsors of Swansea City. The sponsorship ended early after the 2012-13 season. In a two-year deal starting in 2013, they sponsored Crawley Town. The company signed a three-year deal with Scottish side Rangers in April 2014 beginning in July 2014. In 2016 they signed a sponsorship deal with Leeds United which ended in 2020, and in 2018 signed a sponsorship deal with Middlesbrough, Derby County, and Preston North End. At the start of the 2018–19 English Championship season, 32Red are the Shirt Sponsors on 5 teams - Leeds United, Aston Villa, Derby County, Preston North End and Middlesbrough.

32Red invest significantly in UK horse racing and are authorised betting partners of British Racing. 32Red has sponsor the Arena Racing Company All Weather Championships since their launch in 2014. This sponsorship sees the 32Red brand associated with over 500 races during the championships. 32Red also sponsor the twilight fixtures at Kempton Park Racecourse and in August 2016 announced their sponsorship of the Haydock Sprint Cup.

The voice of 32Red's online casino is provided by British actress Patsy Kensit and TV presenters Ant & Dec.

Controversies
In October 2010, 32Red's dispute with William Hill over the use of 32Vegas reached the High Court of Justice in London where a six-day trial took place over the matter. 32Red objected to Hill's use of the 32Vegas brand (which was renamed 21Nova subsequent to 32Red instigating legal proceedings). Handing down Judgment in January 2011, Mr Justice Henderson ruled that William Hill had infringed the 32Red trade mark and that their counterclaims against the validity of 32Red's trade marks (32 and 32Red) were dismissed.

Acquisition
In September 2014, 32Red Plc announced the purchase of GoWild Casino's United Kingdom based customer database.
In June 2015, 32Red Plc announced the purchase of Roxy Palace Casino for £8.4 million.
In March 2016, 32Red announced net gaming revenue of £48.7m in 2015, up 52% year-over-year, and revealed that it is evaluating possible acquisitions. In July 2017, 32Red was acquired by the Kindred Group.

In June 2018, the Gambling Commission fined 32Red £2 million for failing a problem gambler who had deposited £758,000 with 32Red over more than two years. 32Red had failed to check the customer, who had a net income of £2,150 per month, could afford the bets despite several previous regulatory rulings in this area.

References

External links 
 

Online gambling companies of the United Kingdom
Online poker companies